Jean-Pierre Kwambamba Masi (born 9 August 1960) is a Democratic Republic of the Congo Roman Catholic bishop.

Kwambamba Masi was born in the Democratic Republic of the Congo and was ordained to the priesthood in 1986. He served as a papal master of ceremony in the Office for the Liturgical Celebrations of the Supreme Pontiff from 2009 to 2015. He served as the titular bishop of Naratcata and as auxiliary bishop of the Roman Catholic Archdiocese of Kinshasa, Democratic Republic of the Congo, from 2015 to 2018 and as bishop of the Roman Catholic Diocese of Kenge from 2018 to the present time.

Notes

1960 births
Living people
21st-century Roman Catholic bishops in the Democratic Republic of the Congo
Roman Catholic bishops of Kinshasa
Roman Catholic bishops of Kenge
21st-century Democratic Republic of the Congo people